Carling is a Canadian brewery.

Carling may also refer to:

Places
 Carling Avenue, a street in Ottawa, Ontario, Canada
 Carling station, at Carling Avenue and Preston Street
 Carling, Moselle, a commune in the region Lorraine, France
 Carling, Ontario, a township in Parry Sound District, Canada

People
 Carling (given name), a unisex given name
Carling (surname), a surname

Other
 Carling (sailing), a piece of timber laid under the deck of a ship
 The Carling, a historic building in Jacksonville, Florida, US
 Carling Academy, operated by the Academy Music Group, including a list of venues
 Carling Campus, federal buildings in Ottawa, Ontario, Canada

See also

 
 
 Carlingford (disambiguation)
 Charlene (disambiguation)
 Charlin (disambiguation)
 Carlin (disambiguation)
 Karlin (disambiguation)